The 1955 Iowa State Teachers Panthers football team was an American football team that represented Iowa State Teachers College (later renamed University of Northern Iowa) in the North Central Conference during the 1955 college football season. In their 18th season under head coach Clyde Starbeck, the team compiled an 8–1 record (5–1 against NCC opponents) and finished in second place in the NCC.

Schedule

References

Iowa State Teachers
Northern Iowa Panthers football seasons
Iowa State Teachers Panthers football